The FIL World Luge Natural Track Championships 1980 took place in Passeier, Italy.

Men's singles

Women's singles

Men's doubles

Medal table

References
Men's doubles natural track World Champions
Men's singles natural track World Champions
Women's singles natural track World Champions

FIL World Luge Natural Track Championships
1980 in luge
1996 in Italian sport
Luge in Italy